Megachile heinrichi is a species of bee in the family Megachilidae. It was described by Tkalcu in 1979.

References

Heinrichi
Insects described in 1979